Westminster is a village in Windham County, Vermont, United States. The population was 287 at the 2020 census.  Most of the village is listed on the National Register of Historic Places in 1988 as the Westminster Village Historic District.

Geography
The village is centered on the junction of United States Route 5 with School and Grout Streets, and extends mainly along US 5. Its western end is roughly Metcalf Drive and Cox Street, and its eastern end is the old cemetery. On School Street the district extends north at least as far as Thompson Road.

History
Westminster, located in the southeastern part of Vermont, was the first town to be chartered, in 1736 by the Province of Massachusetts Bay.  The layout of the village center took place in 1736–1737, and initially called for an unusually broad Main Street (now US 5).  The basic plan for the village today still shows elements of this plan, with a still-broad main road layout (reduced in width in 1781 after the original plan was deemed too wide), and in the placement of municipal and civic buildings.  The town hall, for example, is built on the foundation of the 18th century colonial meeting house, retaining its exterior dimensions.

Because Westminster was in an area disputed by several colonial governments, it had a second charter issued by the Province of New Hampshire in 1740, only to have that charter invalidated by a crown decision awarding the Vermont area to the Province of New York in 1764.  This territorial dispute culminated in the formation of Vermont as a separate state, but not without bloodshed.  Two men were fatally wounded in the Westminster massacre on March 13, 1775, in a dispute between supporters of the New York claim (led by the local New York-appointed sheriff), and a group of anti-New Yorkers occupying the courthouse.  This event was significant in leading to the eventual declaration of the Vermont Republic in 1777, and its admission to the Union as a separate state in 1793.  Westminster was one of the seats of the republic's legislature, and served as a county seat until 1787.

Demographics

As of the census of 2000, there were 276 people, 118 households, and 78 families residing in the village.  The population density was 209.1 people per square mile (80.7/km2).  There were 124 housing units at an average density of 93.9/sq mi (36.3/km2).  The racial makeup of the village was 100.00% White.

There were 118 households, out of which 28.0% had children under the age of 18 living with them, 57.6% were married couples living together, 7.6% had a female householder with no husband present, and 33.1% were non-families. 25.4% of all households were made up of individuals, and 10.2% had someone living alone who was 65 years of age or older.  The average household size was 2.34 and the average family size was 2.85.

In the village, the population was spread out, with 20.3% under the age of 18, 9.4% from 18 to 24, 21.0% from 25 to 44, 33.3% from 45 to 64, and 15.9% who were 65 years of age or older.  The median age was 44 years. For every 100 females, there were 84.0 males.  For every 100 females age 18 and over, there were 86.4 males.

The median income for a household in the village was $47,969, and the median income for a family was $54,643. Males had a median income of $30,833 versus $26,375 for females. The per capita income for the village was $22,261.  None of the families and 2.7% of the population were living below the poverty line, including no under eighteens and 5.1% of those over 64.

See also
National Register of Historic Places listings in Windham County, Vermont

References

Incorporated villages in Vermont
Westminster, Vermont
Villages in Windham County, Vermont
Historic districts on the National Register of Historic Places in Vermont
Georgian Revival architecture in Vermont
Victorian architecture in Vermont
National Register of Historic Places in Windham County, Vermont